Dr. A. V. Baliga College, Kumta is the oldest college in Uttar Kannada district affiliated to Karnatak University, Dharwad and was called Kanara College.  Dr. A. V. Baliga was largely instrumental in establishing the Kanara College of Arts and Science in Kumta town.

The institution is the first college and at present the lead college in the Uttara Kannada District, was founded with the name "KANARA COLLEGE" on 20 June 1949 with the great efforts late Shri L. .S. Kamat, late shri. N.T.Hegde, late Shri. M.R. Dewekar and other local leaders. The great philanthrope late Dr. A. V. Baliga strengthened their hands.

The college was renamed as Dr. A. V. Baliga College to commemorate late Dr. Baliga's gesture of generosity. The college successfully celebrated Silver Jubilee in 1976 and Golden Jubilee in 2002.

This college offers B.A., B.Sc, B.com, BBA and M.Sc (Analytical Chemistry) degrees.

The former principals
 R C Badve
 S S Koppalkar
 S R Narayan Rao
 D S Anand
 R H Kamat
 S V Naik
 J J Valiplavan
 Dr P A Bhat
 Dr S V Kamath
 Dr V K Hampiholi
 Dr M M Adkoli
 Dr G T Kuchinad
 Dr U G Shastri 
 Dr S N Shetty
 Dr P K Bhat (Present)

Notable alumni
N. H. Gouda
Jayant Kaikini
Narayan Hosmane
N. K. Naik
Ramesh. M. Revankar
Pallavi Subhash Chandran
Y.A. Shaikh
Ajit Nayak

References

Colleges in Karnataka
Universities and colleges in Uttara Kannada district
Karnatak University